Moe Hay Ko (born Aye Aye Khine on 26 June 1985) is a Burmese actress, model, producer and businesswoman. She is the Myanmar's third highest-paid actress and considered one of the most commercially successful actresses in Burmese cinema. Throughout her successful career, she has acted in over 300 films.

Moe has won the Asia Model Award at the 2015 Asia Model Festival, held in Seoul in 2015.

Early life and education
Moe Hay Ko was born on 26 June 1985 in Mandalay, Myanmar. She is the middle daughter of Kyaw Min and his wife Nu Nu Sein. She has an elder brother and younger brother. She graduated high school from Basic Education High School No. 1 South Okkalapa.

Career

1997–2004: Beginning as a commercial model
Moe joined Tin Moe Lwin's model training at the grade 9. She officially entered the entertainment industry in 1999 was as a model as part of the John Lwin's John International Modeling Agency with countless modelling competition and runways that had been walked on. Then came the offers for TV commercials and then DVD ones. Her hardwork as a model and acting in commercials was noticed by the film industry and soon, movie casting offers came rolling in.

2005–2006: Film debut and recognition
Moe made her film debut with a leading role in the film Eain Mat Alon (Beyond the dream), alongside Lu Min, film released in 2005. The same year, she then starred a female lead in the film Kyun Ma Ma Hay Thi (I'm Mistress) alongside Pyay Ti Oo and Khine Hnin Wai. In 2006, she starred in the film A Hmyin, where she played the leading role with Lu Min, Ye Deight, and Tint Tint Tun. The film was both a domestic hit in Myanmar, and led to increased recognition for Moe Hay Ko.

2008–present: Breaking into the big screen and career success
In 2008, Moe took on her first big-screen leading role in the film Moe Nya Eain Mat Mhyu, alongside Nay Toe, Soe Pyae Thazin, Thinzar Wint Kyaw, and directed by Kyi Phyu Shin which screened in Myanmar cinemas in 2009. The film was nominated Best Actress for Moe Hay Ko and have won Best Actor for Nay Toe and Best Supporting Actress for Soe Pyae Thazin at the 2009 Myanmar Academy Award Ceremony.

In 2013, Moe starred in the big-screen film HnaLonThar Phyint Pyuu-Lote Thi (Made with Heart) where she played the leading role with Pyay Ti Oo, Wutt Hmone Shwe Yi and directed by Wyne which screened in Myanmar cinemas in 2014, which earned her a nomination for the 2018 Myanmar Academy Award for Best Actress and have won three Academy Awards at the 2014 Myanmar Academy Award Ceremony. From 2005 to present, she has acted in over 300 video/films.

Film production and business
In 2014, Moe established a film production company called Moe Film Production, whose first film Yone Pati Thee Lay Myar (The Littile Okras). One of the produced films named Koe Soe Lu Hnite which received overwhelming support from the audience. From 2014 to present, the production have produced over 10 film. On 27 March 2015, she opened the Moe Fabric House, a store selling silk, cotton and traditional fabric.

Book
In 2016, Moe had also produced a travel documentary book titled Kya Ma Chit Thaw (My Beloved), a travel diary of sorts that came together with stunning photos of Moe Hay Ko herself and beautiful, local places she'd visited. The book was printed in Thailand with a first run of 2000 copies.

Filmography

Films
Over 300 films

Films (Cinema)

Awards and nominations

References

External links

1985 births
Living people
Burmese film actresses
Burmese female models
21st-century Burmese actresses